The following is an incomplete list of fictional characters featured in the books and stories of P. G. Wodehouse, by series, in alphabetical order by series name. Due to overlap between the various classifications of Wodehouse's work, some characters appear more than once.

Blandings Castle

Threepwood family

 Clarence Threepwood, 9th Earl of Emsworth

Emsworth's siblings and their families

 The Hon. Galahad Threepwood, Emsworth's unmarried younger brother
 The Hon. Lancelot Threepwood, Emsworth's deceased brother
 Millicent Threepwood, his daughter
 Lady Ann Warblington, Emsworth's sister, sometime châtelaine at Blandings
 Jane, deceased sister of Emsworth
 Angela, daughter of Jane, Emsworth's niece
Lady Constance Keeble, later Schoonmaker, Emsworth's bossiest sister
 Joseph Keeble, her first husband, Phyllis Jackson's stepfather.
 Phyllis Jackson, Joe Keeble's stepdaughter
 Michael "Mike" Jackson, her husband, an old friend of Psmith
 James Schoonmaker, Lady Constance's second husband, an American millionaire and an old friend of Uncle Fred
 Myra Schoonmaker, his daughter who marries Bill Bailey despite Lady Constance's best efforts
 Lady Charlotte, Emsworth's sister, "a tougher egg even than Lady Constance, or her younger sister, Lady Julia".
 Jane, her daughter
 Lady Julia Fish, Emsworth's tall and blonde sister
 Maj. Gen. Sir Miles Fish, her late husband
 Ronnie Fish, their son and a member of the Drones Club
 Lady Florence Moresby, another of Emsworth's domineering sisters
 J. J. Underwood, Lady Florence's deceased first husband
 Kevin Moresby, her second husband, from whom she has separated
 Dora, Lady Garland, Emsworth's tall and stately sister
 Sir Everard Garland, K.C.B., her late husband
 Prudence Garland, Lady Dora's daughter
 Lady Hermione Wedge, Emsworth's sister, who looks like a cook
 Colonel Egbert Wedge, Lady Hermione's husband
 Veronica Wedge, the Wedges' beautiful but simple daughter
 Georgiana, Lady Alcester, another sister of Lord Emsworth, who owns fourteen dogs
 Gertrude Alcester, her daughter
 Lady Diana Phipps, the only one of Emsworth's sisters whom Galahad likes
 Wilfred Allsop, Lord Emsworth's nephew, of uncertain parentage

Emsworth's children and their families

 George Threepwood, Lord Bosham, Emsworth's elder son and heir to the earldom
 Cecily Threepwood, Lord Bosham's wife
 James Threepwood, their elder son
 George Threepwood, their second son
 The Hon. Freddie Threepwood, Emsworth's younger son
 Niagara "Aggie" Donaldson, Freddie's wife
 Penelope Donaldson, Aggie's younger sister
 Mr Donaldson, dog-biscuit king, father of Aggie and Penelope
 Lady Mildred Mant, Emsworth's eldest daughter
 Colonel Horace Mant, her husband

Distant relations

 Percy, Lord Stockheath, Emsworth's nephew, whose parents are never named
 Algernon Wooster, Lord Stockheath's cousin, implying Bertie Wooster may be a relation too
 The Bishop of Godalming, a relative of the Threepwoods
 Mrs Jack Hale, mentioned as belonging to the collateral branch of the family (Something Fresh)
 The 8th Earl of Emsworth - Clarence's father (Company for Gertrude; page 95)
 Robert - uncle of Clarence (Company for Gertrude; page 96)
 Claude - cousin of Clarence (Company for Gertrude; page 96)
 Alistair - maternal uncle of Clarence (Company for Gertrude; page 96)

Domestic staff

Secretaries

 Rupert Baxter, Lord Emsworth's original, very efficient secretary
 Montague "Monty" Bodkin, also Emsworth's secretary for a time
 Lavender Briggs, a tall and haughty secretary
 Alexandra "Sandy" Callender, an attractive but fiery red-headed secretary
 Hugo Carmody, another secretary, and a friend of Ronnie Fish
 Rupert Psmith, Baxter's replacement as secretary
 Gerald Anstruther Vail, a thriller-writer, and briefly Emsworth's secretary
 Eve Halliday, hired to catalogue the library

House staff

 Sebastian Beach, butler
 Maudie, his much-married niece
 Mrs Twemlow, housekeeper
 Merridew, an under-butler
 James and Alfred, Thomas and Stokes, Charles and Henry, footmen at the Castle

Outdoor staff

 Thorne, the Scottish Head Gardener in Something Fresh
 Angus McAllister, the Scottish Head Gardener after Thorne
 Slingsby, a chauffeur
 Alfred Voules, another chauffeur

Pig staff

 George Cyril Wellbeloved, Emsworth's first pig man, who defects to the Parsloe-Parsloe camp
 James Pirbright, another pig man, Wellbeloved's replacement
 Edwin Pott, the pig man in Full Moon
 Monica Simmons, a pig girl of Amazonian proportions

Other characters

 Empress of Blandings, Lord Emsworth's beloved black Berkshire sow
 Sir Gregory Parsloe-Parsloe, Bart., neighbour and rival of Lord Emsworth
 Herbert Binstead, Parsloe's butler
 The Pride of Matchingham, Parsloe-Parsloe's pig
 The Queen of Matchingham, another pig owned by Parsloe-Parsloe
 James Bartholomew Belford, a farmer, whom Angela loves
 Major Wilfred "Plug" Basham, an old friend of Galahad and feature of his stories
 Admiral George J. "Fruity" Biffen, another old friend of Galahad
 The Rev. Rupert "Beefy" Bingham, Freddie's university pal
 "Puffy" Benger, yet another of Galahad's old cronies
 Quincy Titterton, Groomsman, employed to mask the fact that he was a paid cricketer in Lord Ellsworth’s estate team
 Sue Brown, a chorus girl who falls for Ronnie Fish
 Edward Cootes, a card-sharp, in love with Aileen Peavey
 Alaric, Duke of Dunstable, an ill-mannered old man, an old friend of Connie
 Horace Pendlebury-Davenport, Dunstable's wealthy nephew
 Alaric "Ricky" Gilpin, Dunstable's impoverished nephew, a poet
 Archibald "Archie" Gilpin, another nephew of Dunstable, also impoverished
 Linda Gilpin, sister of Ricky and Dunstable's niece, a ward of court
 George Emerson, a Hong Kong policeman, in love with Aline Peters
 Lord Heacham, a rich landowner, once engaged to Angela
 Frederick Twistleton, Earl of Ickenham, a mischievous old Pelican
 Pongo Twistleton, Fred's ever-embarrassed nephew
 Valerie Twistleton, Fred's niece, who loves Horace Pendlebury-Davenport
 R. Jones, a fat bookmaker and conman
 Bill Lister, Galahad's godson, an artist who loves Prudence Garland
 Ashe Marson, a writer, the hero of Something Fresh
 Ralston McTodd, a Canadian poet
 Aileen Peavey (a.k.a. Smooth Lizzie), an American poet and crook
 Aline Peters, Freddie's fiancée in Something Fresh
 J. Preston Peters, Aline's father, a scarab collector
 Percy Frobisher Pilbeam, head of the Argus Private Inquiry Agency
 Tipton Plimsoll, a wealthy American friend of Freddie's, who falls for Veronica Wedge
 Claude "Mustard" Pott, another private detective, hired by Lord Bosham
 Polly Pott, Mustard's pretty daughter, engaged to Ricky Gilpin
 Gloria Salt, an athletic girl, who is engaged to Sir Gregory Parsloe-Parsloe for a time
 George Alexander Pyke, Lord Tilbury, a publisher and pig owner
 Orlo Watkins, a tenor with whom Gertrude Alcester becomes infatuated
 Dame Daphne Winkworth, headmistress of a girls' school in Eastbourne; also a friend of Aunt Agatha
 Gerald Anstruther Vail, a thriller-writer who loves Penelope Donaldson
 Joan Valentine, the heroine of Something Fresh
 Orlo, Lord Vosper, a handsome nobleman who visits Blandings in Pigs Have Wings
 Augustus Whiffle (or Whipple), author of Lord Emsworth's favorite book, The Care of the Pig
 Jane Yorke, a friend of Freddie's wife Aggie

Golf stories

 The Oldest Member
 Agnes Flack
 Sidney McMurdo
 The Wrecking Crew, a foursome:
 The First Grave Digger
 The Man with the Hoe
 Old Father Time
 Proconsul, the Almost-Human
 Felicia Blakeny
 Chester Meredith

Jeeves and Wooster

 Reginald Jeeves
 Bertie Wooster (Bertram Wilberforce Wooster)

Jeeves's relations

 his niece Mabel, a model ("The Rummy Affair of Old Biffy" from Carry On, Jeeves)
 his cousin Egbert, constable of Beckley-in-the-Moor ("Without the Option" from Carry On, Jeeves)
 his uncle Charlie Silversmith, butler at Deverill Hall in Hampshire (The Mating Season)
 Queenie, daughter of Charlie Silversmith, maid at Deverill Hall
 his aunt P.B. Pigott, in Maiden Eggesford (Aunts Aren't Gentlemen, also titled The Cat-nappers)

Bertie's relations

 his aunt Dahlia Travers, sister to his late father
 her husband Tom Travers, his uncle
 Angela Travers, Tom and Dahlia's daughter
 Bonzo Travers, Tom and Dahlia's son
 his aunt Agatha Gregson, later Lady Worplesdon, sister to his late father
 Spenser Gregson, her first husband
 Thomas Gregson, (Thos.), their son
 Percy Craye, Earl of Worplesdon, her second husband
 Lady Florence Craye, Lord Worplesdon's daughter
 Edwin Craye, his son, a Boy Scout
 Zenobia "Nobby" Hopwood, his ward
 his uncle Willoughby Wooster, Bertie's initial trustee, resident of a country seat in Shropshire, notable for his scandalous Reminiscences
 his uncle Henry Wooster, a very personable 'looney' who kept pet rabbits in his bedroom
 Emily Wooster, Henry's widow
 Claude and Eustace Wooster, Henry and Emily's troublesome twin sons, Bertie's cousins
 his uncle George Wooster, Lord Yaxley, who has devoted his entire life to the pleasures of the table, and "discovered that alcohol was a food well in advance of modern medical thought"
 Maud Wilberforce, a former barmaid and Lord Yaxley's former fiancée, whom he ends up marrying
 his sister Mrs. Scholfield, who lives in India with her three daughters
 Gussie Mannering-Phipps, Bertie's cousin in New York
 Ray Denison, Gussie's fiancée and music hall performer

Bertie's friends

 Harold "Beefy" Anstruther, Bertie's friend from Oxford, engaged to Hilda, a friend of Madeline Bassett
 Cyril Bassington-Bassington
 Bill Belfry, 9th Earl of Rowcester, an impoverished friend of Bertie and a fellow member of the Drones Club
 Francis "Bicky" Bickersteth, a young Englishman sent to make his fortune in New York
 The Duke of Chiswick, Bicky's wealthy and displeased uncle
 Charles Edward "Biffy" Biffen, a fellow member of the Drones Club, who is extremely absent-minded and in love with Jeeves's niece Mabel
 The Rev. Rupert "Beefy" Bingham, a school friend, also a friend of Freddie Threepwood
 Freddie Bullivant, another Drones Club member
 Elizabeth Vickers, the girl whom Freddie loves
 Marmaduke, 5th Baron "Chuffy" Chuffnell, a school friend
 Myrtle, the Dowager Lady Chuffnell, Chuffy's aunt
 Seabury, Lady Chuffnell's son by her first marriage
 Bruce "Corky" Corcoran, a New York portrait painter turned cartoonist
 Alexander Worple, Corky's wealthy uncle
 Muriel Singer, first Corky's fiancée and later Mrs Alexander Worple
 Augustus "Gussie" Fink-Nottle, lover of newts
 George Webster "Boko" Fittleworth, author of plays and fiction
 Cyril "Barmy" Fotheringay-Phipps (pronounced "Funghy Fipps")
 Hildebrand "Tuppy" Glossop, Sir Roderick Glossop's nephew
 Cora Bellinger, an opera singer whom Tuppy loves
 Reginald "Kipper" Herring, former fellow inmate of Malvern House, their preparatory school.
 Richard P. "Bingo" Little, renowned in the early days for his ability to fall in love with every girl he meets, later marries Rosie M. Banks and becomes editor of Wee Tots magazine
 Rosie Little, née Rosie M. Banks, Bingo's wife, a novelist whom Bertie impersonates once
 Algernon Aubrey Little, Bingo's son
 Mortimer Little, Lord Bittlesham, Bingo's uncle and provider of his allowance
 The Rev. Harold "Stinker" Pinker, curate in Market Snodsbury.
 Stephanie "Stiffy" Pinker, née Byng, his wife
 Not to be confused with Lionel "Stinker" Green, a minor character in Money in the Bank.
 Claude Cattermole "Catsmeat" Potter-Pirbright, a school friend
 Cora "Corky" Pirbright, his sister
 Rev. Sidney Pirbright, Catsmeat's and Corky's uncle; vicar of King's Deverill
 Oliver Randolph "Sippy" Sipperley, an impecunious aspiring author
 Vera Sipperley, his aunt and means of financial support
 Professor Pringle, his daughter Heloise, and aunt Jane, friends of Aunt Vera
 Gwendolen Moon, a poet with whom he is in love
 Rockmetteller "Rocky" Todd, a poet who lives on Long Island and hates New York City
 Isabel Rockmetteller, Rocky's fun-loving aunt

Bertie's antagonists

 Sir Watkyn Bassett, CBE, a magistrate in Bosher Street
 Madeline Bassett, his daughter
 Stephanie "Stiffy" Byng, his niece
 Butterfield, his butler
 Major Plank, who wanted to call the police on Bertie
 D'Arcy "Stilton" Cheesewright
 Sir Roderick Glossop, a 'nerve specialist' in Harley Street, became Bertie's good friend in Thank You, Jeeves
 Lady Glossop, his wife
 Hildebrand "Tuppy" Glossop, his nephew
 Honoria Glossop, his daughter
 Oswald Glossop, Honoria's younger brother
 Roderick Spode, 7th Earl of Sidcup, an amateur fascist dictator and designer of women's underclothing
 Mrs. Wintergreen, his aunt
 Col. H. H. Wintergreen, late husband of Mrs. Wintergreen
 Aubrey Upjohn, Bertie's former headmaster at Malvern House.

Romantic interests and fiancées

 Madeline Bassett, Sir Watkyn Bassett's daughter
 Daphne Braythwayt, Honoria Glossop's friend
 Stephanie "Stiffy" Byng, later Mrs. Harold Pinker, Watkyn Bassett's niece
 Lady Florence Craye, Lord Worplesdon's daughter
 Honoria Glossop, Sir Roderick Glossop's daughter
 Aline Hemmingway, Soapy Sid's partner in crime
 Gwladys Pendlebury, an artist who paints Bertie's portrait
 Pauline Stoker
 J. Washburn Stoker, her father, an American millionaire
 Dwight Stoker, Washburn's son and Pauline's younger brother
 Emerald Stoker, Pauline's sister
 Benstead, valet to George Stoker, Washburn's late cousin; a friend of Jeeves
 Lady Cynthia Wickhammersley, daughter of Lord Wickhammersley
 Roberta "Bobbie" Wickham, enamoured of practical jokes
 Lady Wickham, Bobbie's mother; an old friend of Aunt Agatha
 Clementina, Bobbie's cousin

Domestic staff

 Meadowes, Jeeves's predecessor as Bertie's valet
 Brinkley (renamed Rupert Bingley), Bertie's valet commissioned when Jeeves gives notice, soon sacked for his insane behavior
 Maple, Lord Worplesdon's butler
 Mulready, Sir Reginald Witherspoon's butler
 Oakshott, Uncle Willoughby's butler
 Purvis, Aunt Agatha's butler
 Seppings, the butler at Aunt Dahlia's home Brinkley Court
 Waterbury, the chauffeur at Brinkley Court
 Anatole, chef extraordinaire, employed by Tom and Dahlia Travers
 Butterfield, butler at Totleigh Towers

Other characters

 Mr Anstruther, an elderly man who holds a Good Conduct competition between Thomas Gregson and Bonzo Travers
 Mr Blumenfeld, theatrical producer
 Comrade Butt, a Marxist revolutionary
 Ernest Dobbs, constable of King's Deverill, and betrothed of Queenie Silversmith, Deverill Hall's beautiful parlourmaid
 The Rt. Hon. A. B. Filmer, a Cabinet Minister
 Esmond Haddock, a man dominated by his aunts
 Charlotte, Emmeline, Harriet, and Myrtle Deverill, and Dame Daphne Winkworth, his aunts
 Sidney "Soapy Sid" Hemmingway, a con man
 Aline Hemmingway, Soapy Sid's partner in crime
 The Rev. Francis Heppenstall, a long-winded vicar
 Mary Burgess, his niece
 Peggy Mainwaring, a student at Miss Tomlinson's school
 Miss Mapleton, headmistress of a girls' school in Bingley
 Sebastian Moon, a detestable young boy with golden curls
 Daphne Dolores Morehead, an attractive blonde bestselling novelist, prob. based on Daphne du Maurier
 Eustace Oates, constable at Totleigh-in-the-Wold
 Wilmot, Lord Pershore, a sheltered young man
 Lady Malvern, his over-protective mother
 Rhoda Platt, a barmaid whom George Wooster, Lord Yaxley thinks he loves
 Lucius Pim, an artist who loves Gwladys Pendlebury
 Beatrice Slingsby, his sister
 Alexander Slingsby, Beatrice's husband
 Laura Pyke, a nutrition-obsessed schoolmate of Rosie M. Banks
 Charlotte Corday Rowbotham, a Marxist with whom Bingo Little falls in love
 Jane Snettisham, Aunt Dahlia's friend, who attempts to win Anatole from her in a bet
 Jack, Lord Snettisham, Jane's husband
 Rupert Steggles, a crooked bookie
 Mrs Tinkler-Moulke, a patient of Sir Roderick Glossop
 Miss Tomlinson, the headmistress of a girls' school
 The Rev. Aubrey Upjohn, headmaster of Malvern House, where Bertie went to school
 Lord Wickhammersley, a friend of Bertie's late father
 Lady Cynthia Wickhammersley, his daughter
 Dame Daphne Winkworth, Aunt Agatha's friend and Madeline Bassett's godmother; also an acquaintance of Lord Emsworth
 Gertrude Winkworth, her daughter
 Jas. Waterbury, the "greasy bird": theatrical agent and blackmailer
 George Travers, Tom Travers's brother
 Sir Reginald Witherspoon, Bart., husband of Tom Travers's sister Katharine
 McIntosh, Aunt Agatha's terrier
 Augustus "Gus" the cat, lives at Brinkley Court, intensely dislikes being disturbed from his sleep and, unlike most cats, dislikes being scratched under the ears

Mr. Mulliner  

 Mr. Mulliner, pub raconteur with a large family, including several nephews.
 his nephew Archibald Mulliner, sock collector who can mimic a hen laying an egg.
 another nephew, Augustine, is a timid young curate who went on to marry his vicar's daughter. His rise through the ranks of the Church of England was partially due to his uncle Wilfred's tonic Buck-U-Uppo. According to N. T. P. Murphy, Augustine is similar to the "pale young curate" Gilbert and Sullivan's The Sorcerer.
 Anselm, another nephew, also a pale young curate. Victoria McLure notes that both Augustine and Anselm endear themselves to the reader because they are "underdogs among the clerical caste", and they must "fight their prospective fathers-in-law in order to gain enough money and enough respect to marry".

Psmith and Mike

 Psmith, an immaculately dressed, monocle-sporting young man. His name is Rupert Psmith in his early appearances, but is changed to Ronald Psmith in Leave it to Psmith (a Blandings story, characters from which are listed above), presumably to avoid confusion with Rupert Baxter
Mr Smith, Psmith's father, an eccentric man
 Mike Jackson, best friend of Psmith
 Burgess, captain of the Wrykyn cricket team
 "Gazeka" Firby-Smith, head of Mike's house at Wrykyn
 Bob Jackson, Mike's elder brother, also at Wrykyn
 Trevor and Clowes, friends of Bob and keen cricketers
 Wain, master of Mike's house at Wrykyn
 Wyatt, Wain's step-stop, who shares a dorm with Mike at Wrykyn
 Neville-Smith, a day boy at Wrykyn, a good fast bowler
 Strachan, the boy who took Mike's place as IX Cricket Captain
 Mr Outwood, master of Mike and Psmith's house at Sedleigh
 Mr Downing, master of another house at Sedleigh
 Adair, very keen cricket captain at Sedleigh
 Tom Jellicoe, a boy in Outwood's house, who shares a dorm with Mike and Psmith
 Spiller, another boy in Outwood's, whose study Psmith steals
 Stone, another boy in Outwood's, a ragger
 Robinson, another boy in Outwood's, Stone's henchman
 Dunster, a Sedleigh old boy and famed ragger
 Sergeant Collard, portly school sergeant as Sedleigh
 John Bickersdyke, head of the New Asiatic Bank
 Mr Rossiter, Head Postage at the Bank, a football fan
 Bannister, Mike's forerunner in Postage
 Bristow, Mike's successor there
 Mr Robert Waller, Head of the Cash Department, an amiable sort, but a secret socialist
 Mr Prebble, an unintelligible socialist orator
 Joe Jackson, one of Mike's brothers, an M.C.C. player
 Reggie Jackson, another cricket playing brother
 Billy Windsor, a New York journalist befriended by Psmith
 Pugsy Maloney, the office-boy at Windsor's paper
 Kid Brady, a boxer boosted by Psmith in New York
 Bat Jarvis, a New York gangster befriended by Psmith
 Long Otto, one of Jarvis' henchmen, a stringy, silent young man
 Spider Reilly, another gang boss, head of the "Three Points" gang
 Jack Repetto, a thug in Reilly's gang, who ruins Psmith's hat
 Dude Dawson, head of the "Table Hill" gang, Reilly's main rival
 Francis Parker, a sinister, well-dressed man

Ukridge

 Stanley Featherstonehaugh Ukridge, entrepreneur
 Julia Ukridge, his aunt
 Oakshott, one of Julia Ukridge's many butlers
 Dora Mason, Julia Ukridge's secretary for a time
 Millie, Ukridge's wife
 Lady Elizabeth Lakenheath, Millie's aunt and guardian before her marriage
 Charles Percy Cuthbertson, who calls himself "Uncle Percy", a distant step-relation of Ukridge
 James "Corky" Corcoran, a writer friend of Ukridge, the narrator of all the Ukridge shorts.
 Bowles, Corky's landlord
 George Tupper, a friend of Ukridge and Corky from Wrykyn days
 B. V. "Boko" Lawlor, an ex-Wrykynian who stands for Parliament
 J. G. "Looney" Coote, another ex-Wrykynian friend
 "Battling" Billson, a boxer managed by Ukridge
 Flossie, Billson's girl
 Teddy Weeks, once a friend of Ukridge and Corky, who becomes a movie star
 Joe "the Lawyer", an unsavoury associate of Ukridge
 Izzy Previn, another untrustworthy type
 Beale, Ukridge's man in Love Among the Chickens
 Professor Derrick, Ukridge's Irish neighbour in Love Among the Chickens
 Phyllis Derrick, the professor's daughter, admired by Jeremy Garnet
 Tom Chase, a friend of the Derricks
 Jeremy Garnet, another writer friend of Ukridge, who narrates Love Among the Chickens
 Harry Hawk, a large local in Love Among the Chickens, who aids Garnet in a plot

Uncle Fred

 Frederick Altamont Cornwallis Twistleton, 5th Earl of Ickenham, familiarly known as Uncle Fred
 Jane, Lady Ickenham, Uncle Fred's wife, who went willingly to the Caribbean
 Pongo Twistleton, nephew of Uncle Fred
 Valerie Twistleton, Pongo's sister

Other

Introduced in rough order of the book in which they first appear

 Clarence MacAndrew Chugwater, a Boy Scout, hero of The Swoop
 Roland Bleke, hero of the A Man of Means shorts, a young man who finds money brings trouble
 James Willoughby Pitt, the hero of A Gentleman of Leisure (U.S. title: The Intrusion of Jimmy)
 Molly McEachern, the girl Jimmy Pitt falls for.
 John McEachern, Molly's father, a policeman
 Arthur Mifflin, an actor, an old friend of Pitt
 "Spennie", Earl of Dreever, who McEachern hopes Molly will marry
 Lady Julia Blunt, Spennie's imperious aunt
 Sir Thomas Blunt, her wealthy husband
 Spike Mullins, a New York thief who becomes Jimmy Pitt's valet for a time
 Charteris, a keen organiser of amateur theatre
 Hargate, a card-sharp who preys on Lord Dreever
 William Paradene West, known to all as Bill, of Bill the Conqueror fame
 Cooley Paradene, Bill West's uncle, a wealthy businessman and collector of rare books
 Otis Paradene, Cooley's sponging brother
 Jasper Daly, Cooley's sponging brother-in-law
 Evelyn Paradene-Kirby, Cooley's baby-talking, sponging niece
 Horace French, an unpleasant youth adopted by Paradene
 Sherman Bastable, Horace's tutor
 Professor Appleby, Horace's white-bearded mentor
 Joe the Dip, a member of Appleby's gang
 Wilfred Slingsby, Paradene's man in London
 Judson Coker, Bill West's best friend, a devout drinker
 Alice Coker, Judson's doting sister, adored by Bill
 Prudence Stryker, a New York chorus girl, old friend of Judson Coker
 George Alexander Pyke, Lord Tilbury, media mogul, who first appears in Bill the Conqueror and later visits Blandings
 Roderick Pyke, Pyke's droopy son
 Frances Hammond, Pyke's doting sister
 Sinclair Hammond, Frances' husband, an archaeologist
 Felicia "Flick" Sheridan, Hammond's orphaned niece, who adores Bill but is engaged to Roderick
 Percy Frobisher Pilbeam, Roderick's deputy on Society Spice, later editor and detective
 Sam Shotter, a somewhat eccentric American, hero of Sam the Sudden (US title: Sam in the Suburbs)
 Mr John B. Pynsent, American Export-Import millionaire, Sam's uncle
 Clarence "Hash" Todhunter, an old seafaring pal of Sam's, who becomes his cook
 Kay Derrick, a pretty young girl, whose photograph Sam falls in love with
 Mr Matthew Wrenn, Kay's uncle and guardian
 Claire Lippett, their fiery maid
 Willoughby Braddock, a schoolfriend of Sam and an old neighbour of Kay
 Mrs Martha Lippett, Claire's mother, housekeeper to Braddock
 Alexander "Chimp" Twist, a.k.a. J Sheringham Adair, a crook employed by Lord Tilbury
 Thomas "Soapy" Molloy, an old comrade of Twist, a conman
 Dora "Dolly" Gunn, Molloy's girl, a skilled pick-pocket
 The late Edward "Finky" Finglass, a bank robber, once a resident of Valley Fields
 Claude Winnington-Bates, an unpleasant Wrykyn old boy
 Mrs Winnington-Bates, mother of Claude, Kay's demanding employer
 Mr Cornelius, a white-bearded estate agent and historian, a friend of Mr Wrenn
 Ogden Ford, an obnoxious child, a popular target of kidnappers and thus known as The Little Nugget
 Elmer Ford, Ogden's wealthy and commanding father
 Mrs Nesta Ford (later Mrs Ford Pett), his doting mother
 Peter Burns, a well-to-do young man, who tries to kidnap Ogden for Mrs Ford
 Cynthia Drassilis, the ambitious fiancée of Peter Burns
 Mrs Drassilis, Cynthia's even more ambitious mother
 Audrey Sheridan, Ogden's governess, once Peter Burns's first love
 Arnold Abney, the mild and pompous headmaster of Sanstead House
 Mr Glossop, an irascible master at Sanstead
 White, butler at Sanstead, soon found to be undercover
 Mrs Attwell, matron as Santead
 "Smooth" Sam Fisher, an intellectual crook who kidnaps Ogden Ford
 Buck MacGinnis, a gang leader and archrival of Smooth Sam Fisher
 Lord Mountry, a nervous young noble
 Augustus Beckford, a pupil at Sanstead, cousin of Lord Mountry
 Tankerville Gifford, an unpleasant socialite
 Miss Benjafield, barmaid at the Feathers an inn near the school
 Peter Pett, Millionaire and wife to Nesta Ford
 Anne Chester, Mr Pett's niece and beloved of Jimmy Crocker
 Jimmy Crocker, wild socialite on the mend
 Eugenia Crocker (Formerly van Brunt), disapproving stepmother of Jimmy and Nesta Ford's sister.
 Bingley Crocker, his father, enthusiastic baseball fan
 Skinner, Chicago Ed (Various Aliases of Bingley Crocker)
 Jerry Mitchell, Mr Pett's physical instructor
 Willie Partridge, Nesta Ford's nephew and inventor of the explosive Partidgite
 Lord Wisbeach (Actually Jack the Gentleman), thief after the explosive
 Lord Wisbeach (The Real One) Piccadilly Jim's friend
 Mr Sturgis, head of a detective agency
 Miss Trimble, private detective and ardent socialist
 Bud Smithers, owner of a dogs' home thought appropriate for Ogden by several conspirators
 Lord Percy Whipple, the man who fights Piccadilly Jim in a club
 Monty Bodkin, a member of the Drones Club who appears in a number of novels and is one of Lord Emsworth's many secretaries
 Gertrude Butterwick, the girl to whom Monty was engaged.
 John G. Butterwick (J. B. Butterwick in 'Pearls'), Gertrude's father, uncle to Ambrose and Reggie, demands that Monty hold a job for one year
 Ambrose Tennyson, cousin of Gertrude Butterwick, elder brother of Reggie, novelist engaged to Lotus Blossom
 Reggie Tennyson, cousin of Gertrude Butterwick, younger brother of Ambrose, Drones Club member and friend of Monty
 Sandy Miller, Monty's secretary in California, the girl he marries.
 Reggie Pepper, the hapless protagonist of several stories; Bertie Wooster's prototype
 Oofy Prosser, the richest member of Drones Club.
 Myrtle Prosser, Oofy's wife.
 Pillingshot, schoolboy at St. Austin's, pose as a 'master detective'
  J G Miller, Jeff to his friends, is the protagonist in Money in the Bank
 Myrtle Shoesmith is Jeff's fiancé 
 Clarissa Cork rents the Hall in Money in the Bank

References

 

 

Wodehouse, P. G.